Shahar Hirsh (born 13 February 1993) is an Israeli footballer who plays as a forward for Hapoel Ramat Gan.

Club career
Hirsh started his career at Hapoel Haifa youth system. On September 18, 2013, he was loaned to Hapoel Afula, and scored 20 goals at 27 matches and finished the season as the top scorer of the league, in addition, he helped the team qualify to the top playoffs.

On March 13, 2014, Hirsh signed with Maccabi Haifa for 3 years. On July 16, 2014, he was loaned to Hapoel Petah Tikva. On 18 October 2014, he scored his first 2 goals at the win 4–1 against Hapoel Acre. Hirsh finished the season with 8 goals at the league, but relegated with the club to Liga Leumit.

International career
On May 23, 2014, he made his debut at Israel national under-21 football team at the 3–2 victory against Serbia.

Honours
Hapoel Haifa
 Toto Cup: 2012–13

Maccabi Haifa
 Israel State Cup: 2015–16

Individual
Liga Leumit top goalscorer: 2013–14 (20 goals)

Statistics 
As of 1 June 2019

References

1993 births
Living people
Israeli footballers
Hapoel Haifa F.C. players
Hapoel Afula F.C. players
Maccabi Haifa F.C. players
Hapoel Petah Tikva F.C. players
Hapoel Ra'anana A.F.C. players
Hapoel Tel Aviv F.C. players
Hapoel Ashkelon F.C. players
Hapoel Ramat Gan F.C. players
Israeli Premier League players
Liga Leumit players
Footballers from Haifa
Israeli people of German-Jewish descent
Association football forwards